In United States railroading, the term national rail network, sometimes termed "U.S. rail network", refers to the entire network of interconnected standard gauge rail lines in North America. It does not include most subway or light rail lines. Federal Railroad Administration regulations require passenger cars used on the national rail network to be heavy and strong enough to protect riders in case of collision with freight trains.

References 

Rail transportation in the United States